The Puggalapannatti (-ññ-) is a Buddhist scripture, part of the Pali Canon of Theravada Buddhism, where it is included in the Abhidhamma Pitaka.

This book deals with classifications of persons, which are arranged numerically, from 1-fold to 10-fold. It lists them at the beginning and then explains them.

Translations 
A Designation of Human Types, tr B. C. Law, 1922, Pali Text Society, Bristol

External links 
 Pali text and English translation at suttacentral.net

Abhidhamma Pitaka
Theravada Buddhist texts